Ellice may refer to:


Places 
 Rural Municipality of Ellice, Manitoba, Canada
 Ellice (electoral district), a former provincial electoral division in the province of Manitoba
 Ellice River, former name of Kuunajuk, Nunavut, Canada
 Ellice Swamp, Ontario, Canada
 Fort Ellice, a Hudson's Bay Company post
 Tuvalu, formerly known as the Ellice Islands (named so after British merchant and politician Edward Ellice the Elder)

People 
 Ellice (surname)
 Ellice (given name)

Other uses 
 Ellice School, a historic schoolhouse in Millis, Massachusetts, United States, on the National Register of Historic Places
 Ellice (ship), two ships and two partial matches

See also 
 Ellis (disambiguation)